Chilostoma cingulatum is a species of medium-sized, air-breathing land snail, a terrestrial pulmonate gastropod mollusk in the family Helicidae, the true snails. 
Subspecies
 Chilostoma cingulatum adamii (Pini, 1876)
 Chilostoma cingulatum alzonai K. L. Pfeiffer, 1951
 Chilostoma cingulatum anauniense (De Betta, 1852)
 Chilostoma cingulatum anconae (Gentiluomo, 1868)
 Chilostoma cingulatum appelii (Kobelt, 1876)
 Chilostoma cingulatum asperulum (Ehrmann, 1910)
 Chilostoma cingulatum baldense (Rossmässler, 1839)
 Chilostoma cingulatum bizona (Rossmässler, 1842)
 Chilostoma cingulatum boccavallense K. L. Pfeiffer, 1951
 Chilostoma cingulatum carrarense (Strobel, 1852)
 Chilostoma cingulatum cingulatum (S. Studer, 1820)
 Chilostoma cingulatum colubrinum (De Cristofori & Jan, 1832)
 Chilostoma cingulatum frigidescens (Del Prete, 1879)
 Chilostoma cingulatum frigidissimum (Paulucci, 1881)
 Chilostoma cingulatum frigidosum (Pollonera, 1890)
 Chilostoma cingulatum gobanzi (Frauenfeld, 1867)
 Chilostoma cingulatum hermesianum (Pini, 1874)
 Chilostoma cingulatum infernale (P. Hesse, 1931)
 Chilostoma cingulatum insubricum (De Cristofori & Jan, 1832)
 Chilostoma cingulatum medoacense (Adami, 1886)
 Chilostoma cingulatum montanum (Paulucci, 1881)
 Chilostoma cingulatum nicatis (Costa, 1836)
 Chilostoma cingulatum nicolisianum (Adami, 1886)
 Chilostoma cingulatum peregrini Falkner, 1998
 Chilostoma cingulatum philippii (Kobelt, 1905)
 Chilostoma cingulatum preslii (Rossmässler, 1836)
 Chilostoma cingulatum sentinense (Piersanti, 1833)
 Chilostoma cingulatum transiens (Adami, 1886)

Habitat
The species is found only on limestone rocks.

Life cycle 

The diameter of the egg of this species is 3.3 mm.

These snails create and use love darts during mating.

References

External links 
 http://www.animalbase.uni-goettingen.de/zooweb/servlet/AnimalBase/home/species?id=1358

Chilostoma
Gastropods described in 1820